Hilton Hotel mainly refers to Hilton Hotels and Resorts, but also may refer to:

Dallas Hilton, in Dallas, Texas, NRHP-listed
 Havana (Cuba) Hilton, now the Hotel Tryp Habana Libre
London Hilton on Park Lane, Mayfair, London.
Cactus Hotel, in San Angelo, Texas, NRHP-listed

See also
Hilton (disambiguation)
Hilton House (disambiguation)